Pik Pak Boom is a 1988 Filipino anthology comedy film directed by Leroy Salvador and starring Herbert Bautista, Lea Salonga, Lilet, Bing Loyzaga, Regine Velasquez, and Dingdong Avanzado. The film consists of two segments: "Manyika" and "Banana Q". Produced by Viva Films, Pik Pak Boom was released on December 25, 1988, as part of the 14th Metro Manila Film Festival (MMFF).

Pik Pak Boom was the second highest-grossing film among the six entries of the festival, after Agila ng Maynila, and won the award for Best Production Design (Manny B. Morfe).

Cast

Release
Pik Pak Boom was given a "G" rating by the Movie and Television Review and Classification Board (MTRCB), and was released on December 25, 1988, as part of the 14th Metro Manila Film Festival (MMFF).

Box office
On its opening day, Pik Pak Boom grossed ₱2.458 million, behind Agila ng Maynila but ahead of other MMFF films. By January, the film would retain its standing as the second highest-grossing film among the six entries of the 14th MMFF.

Accolades

References

External links

1988 films
1988 comedy films
Filipino-language films
Philippine comedy films
Philippine teen films
Viva Films films